African theatre or African Theatre may refer to:

 African theatre of World War I
 African Theatre of World War II
 Part of the Mediterranean Theater of Operations of the United States Armed Forces during World War II
 African Theatre (acting troupe), a 19th-century African-American theater based in Harlem, New York City
 African Theatre (Cape Town), a South African theatre